Widow Piper's Tavern, also known as the Old Courthouse and Shippensburg Civic Center, is a historic inn and tavern located at Shippensburg in Cumberland County, Pennsylvania. It was built about 1735, and is a 2 1/2-story, irregular stone building with a 1-story kitchen wing.  It housed the First Court of General Sessions of the Peace from July 1750 to April 1751. The building was donated to the Civic Club of Shippensburg in the 1930s.

It was listed on the National Register of Historic Places in 1974.  It is located in the Shippensburg Historic District.

References

External links
Civic Club of Shippensburg website

Commercial buildings on the National Register of Historic Places in Pennsylvania
Commercial buildings completed in 1735
Buildings and structures in Cumberland County, Pennsylvania
National Register of Historic Places in Cumberland County, Pennsylvania